Days Into Years is the third full-length album by Canadian alternative country band Elliott Brood, released September 27, 2011 on Paper Bag Records. The recording is also available on vinyl.

The album's first single, "If I Get Old", was inspired by a visit to the Étaples Military Cemetery in France, where many dead Canadian soldiers from World War I are buried. The album also includes the band's song "West End Sky", originally composed for the soundtrack to Adriana Maggs' film Grown Up Movie Star. This song was nominated for Best Achievement in Music – Original Song at the 31st Genie Awards.

Track listing
 Lindsay
 Lines
 If I Get Old
 Hold You
 Will They Bury Us?
 West End Sky
 Northern Air
 My Mother's Side
 Owen Sound
 Their Will

References

2011 albums
Elliott Brood albums
Paper Bag Records albums